Nonaflate, is the common name given to nonafluorobutanesulfonates, the salts or esters of perfluorobutanesulfonic acid. Its uses are similar to those of triflate.
It is a good leaving group. It is a substitute for more toxic long-chain PFAS chemicals.

References

Leaving groups
Anions
Perfluorosulfonic acids